Streptomyces exfoliatus is a bacterium species from the genus of Streptomyces which has been isolated from soil. Streptomyces exfoliatus has the ability to degrade poly(3-hydroxyalkanoate). This species produces exfoliatin and exfoliamycin.

Further reading

See also 
 List of Streptomyces species

References

External links
Type strain of Streptomyces exfoliatus at BacDive -  the Bacterial Diversity Metadatabase

exfoliatus
Bacteria described in 1948